Bashqurtaran (also Romanized as Bāshqūrtārān and Bāsh Qūrtārān; also known as Bashgoor Taran and Bāsh Qūtrān) is a village in Mehraban-e Olya Rural District, Shirin Su District, Kabudarahang County, Hamadan Province, Iran. At the 2006 census, its population was 288, in 54 families.

References 

Populated places in Kabudarahang County